In painting, accidentalism is the effect produced by accidental lights.

References

External links

 

Painting